Nick Del Calzo is an American photographer and journalist, who specializes in portraits.

Career 
Del Calzo had previously worked as a public relations executive, prior to retirement.

His portraits have been featured on the CBS Sunday Morning Show and CNN.

Medal of Honor
This portraits of recipients of the Medal of Honor forms the basis for the book Medal of Honor, which is now in its 3rd edition.  It also is part of an exhibition, which is on permanent display in the Hall of Heroes at the Pentagon and at the Center for American Values in Pueblo, Colorado.

His Works 
Del Calzo, Nick, Renee Rockford, and Linda J. Raper. The Triumphant Spirit: Portraits & Stories of Holocaust Survivors, Their Messages of Hope & Compassion. Denver, CO: Triumphant Spirit Pub, 1997.  
In Honored Glory.  
Del Calzo, Nick, and Peter Collier. Medal of Honor: Portraits of Valor Beyond the Call of Duty. New York: Artisan, 2011.  
Del Calzo, Nick, and Peter Collier. Wings of Valor: Honoring America's Fighter Aces. 	Annapolis, Maryland : Naval Institute Press, 2016.

Personal life 
Del Calzo lives in Denver, Colorado.

References

External links 

American portrait photographers
American photojournalists
Living people
Year of birth missing (living people)